Scopula fernaria is a moth of the family Geometridae. It was described by Schaus in 1940. It is endemic to Puerto Rico.

References

Endemic fauna of Puerto Rico
Moths described in 1940
fernaria
Taxa named by William Schaus
Moths of the Caribbean